Fraternidad Cristiana de Guatemala (or Mega Frater) is an evangelical megachurch, current pentecostal, in Mixco (Ciudad San Cristóbal), Guatemala. The senior pastor of this community is Dr. Jorge H. Lopez . In 2016, the attendance was 20,000 people.

History 
The church was founded in 1979 by Dr. Jorge H. Lopez with 20 people. In 2007, the new building was inaugurated. In 2007, the weekly attendance was 12,000 people. In 2017, the church had 20,000 people.

Building 
Construction of the building began in 2001. After 6 years of construction, it was inaugurated in 2007. The auditorium has 12,200 seats.

See also
List of the largest evangelical churches
List of the largest evangelical church auditoriums
Worship service (evangelicalism)

References

External links

 frater.org - Official Website

Evangelical megachurches in Guatemala
Christian organizations established in 1994
Churches completed in 2007